MedStar National Rehabilitation Network (MedStar NRH) is located in Washington, D.C., and specializes in treating persons with physical disabilities, including spinal cord injury, brain injury, stroke, arthritis, amputation, multiple sclerosis, post-polio syndrome, orthopedic, and other neurological conditions.  
National Rehabilitation Hospital was founded in 1986 by Edward A. Eckenhoff, and is a member of the MedStar Health system, the Washington, D.C.-Baltimore region's largest non-profit healthcare organization.

MedStar National Rehabilitation Hospital has grown from a single hospital into MedStar National Rehabilitation Network, which provides inpatient, outpatient, and day treatment programs. The network provides more than 350,000 ambulatory visits annually in addition to the hospital's more than 2,200 inpatient admissions. Since its inception, MedStar NRH has admitted in excess of 35,000 inpatients and provided over 2 million outpatient visits.

History

Edward A. Eckenhoff

Eckenhoff founded the hospital in 1986 and is currently the President Emeritus of MedStar NRH.  After suffering a spinal cord injury which left him paralyzed from the waist down Edward A. Eckenhoff founded the National Rehabilitation Hospital.

On February 6, 1986, MedStar NRH opened its doors with 230 staff members and one patient.  MedStar NRH soon grew to be one of the most well recognized hospitals in the country.  It has hosted guests like Nancy Reagan, Barbara Bush, Queen Sofia of Spain, Bob Dole, and Stevie Wonder.

Eckenhoff has also received numerous awards including "Washingtonian of the year" by 
Washingtonian magazine and was named “Alumnus of the Year” by Washington University School of Medicine.  Eckenhoff played a major role in the passing of the Americans with Disabilities Act of 1990 with his visits to Capitol Hill and work around the community.  MedStar NRH strongly supported Eckenhoff's venture and was a vital part in improving the lives of the disabled.  The current president is John Rockwood who adopted the role in October 2010.

Reputation and Accreditation

Ranking

Physicians nationwide consistently rank MedStar NRH among “America’s Best Hospitals,” as reported by U.S. News & World Report.  Since 1990, MedStar NRH has been consistently listed in the annual ranking as one of the nation's best hospitals for physical rehabilitation.

http://health.usnews.com/best-hospitals/rankings/rehabilitation?page=2

MedStar NRH is fully accredited by both the Joint Commission on Accreditation of Healthcare Organizations JCAHO, and the Commission on Accreditation of Rehabilitation Facilities CARF, earning an impressive fourteen CARF commendations in the 2007 accreditation survey.  CARF is a private, not-for-profit organization that promotes quality rehabilitation services. Their standards are reviewed annually and new ones are developed to keep pace with changing conditions and current consumer needs. NRH has received a three-year accreditation from CARF, and its Spinal Cord Injury, Stroke and Brain Injury programs are the regions only CARF accredited specialty programs.

Types of Specialty Care: Inpatient, Outpatient, and Day Treatment

MedStar NRH's board-certified physicians, neuropsychologists, physical therapists, occupational therapists, speech-language pathologists, psychologists, vocational rehabilitation counselors, and other clinicians work in teams to meet the needs of patients with a wide range of neurological, and orthopedic conditions. 
MedStar NRH provides highly specialized acute inpatient rehabilitative care at its Washington, D.C., location on a campus adjacent to its MedStar Health sister hospital, the MedStar Washington Hospital Center.   
NRH works in partnership not only with the MedStar Washington Hospital Center, but also with a number of other leading acute care facilities throughout the region. Acute rehab begins at onset of injury and illness, and continues after hospitalization through the NRH Rehabilitation Network – with over 50 outpatient sites located throughout the Washington, D.C., Northern Virginia, and Maryland region.

(See https://web.archive.org/web/20121205130915/http://www.medstarnrh.org/Locations/default.aspx for a list of outpatient locations.)

In addition, for those needing more intense therapy following hospitalization, MedStar NRH offers unique Day Treatment programs for stroke, brain and spinal cord injury, which provide continued comprehensive care to maximize potential for recovery.

Vocational Care

Meant for patients who have occurred a brain injury, spinal cord injury, stroke, amputation, and burns.  This program has also been accredited for treating motion disorders, arthritis, chronic pain syndromes, cardiac disorders, and other neurologic conditions.  There are both inpatient and outpatient services available with each staff member certified in rehabilitation counseling (CRC).

Spinal Cord Injury

More than 200 spinal cord injured patients come to MedStar NRH each year for treatment.  Some injuries MedStar NRH encounters are spinal cord disease, spinal stenosis, multiple sclerosis, postoperative spinal surgery, and Guillain Barre syndrome.  Emphasis is on the prevention of primary and secondary conditions and on the patients’ participation.  The Seating and Mobility Clinic offers evaluations for patients wheeled mobility needs based on functional strength, range of motion, postural alignment, and skin integrity.  MedStar NRH was also one of the first hospitals in the country to use the Lokomat.  This provides body weight support for gait training.

Brain Injury

Faculty provides care for thousands suffering from mild to traumatic brain injuries.  The concussion clinic at Medstar NRH focuses primarily on this form of brain injury and is regarded as one of the best in the country, according to U.S. News & World Report. 75 percent of all traumatic brain injuries that occur are concussions.  Traumatic brain injuries contribute to a third of all deaths in the United States with over 1.5 million brain injuries occurring each year.  During their stay, patients are also educated on precautions they can take to prevent a future incidence.

Stroke

Treat inpatient and outpatient stroke victims.  With over 800,000 stroke victims each year, MedStar NRH has developed one of the largest stroke programs in the region.  Over 600 stroke patients are cared for each year at MedStar NRH with 96 percent being able to return home within 90 days.  The stroke recovery program aims to offer stroke comprehensive inpatient, day treatment, and outpatient rehabilitation that are tailored to each patient's needs and abilities.

Gala Victory Awards®
Created when the hospital opened in 1986, the Victory Awards honor individuals who have overcome physical adversity and inspired others.  Awards have been given out to people from many different areas such as art, entertainment, sports, and politics.  This event also raises money to advance treatments and the hospital.

Past winners

25th Anniversary

In 2011, MedStar NRH celebrated their 25th anniversary with their annual Gala Victory Award's in which they recognized several key contributors to the advancement of rehab.

MedStar NRH has been accredited by The Joint Commission and CARF as one of the most reliable rehabilitation hospitals in the country. They are the Commission on Accreditation of Rehabilitation Facilities. CARF Accredited Medstar NRH with Specialty Programs in Stroke Recovery, Spinal Cord Injury and Brain Injury.
 
Being a non-profit organization, the team at MedStar NRH uses the approach of care that puts the patient first.

Special Programs

CARF Accredited

MedStar NRH's Spinal Cord Program is the area's only CARF Accredited Specialty Program for Spinal Cord Injury and Disease.

The Rehabilitation Research and Training Center (RRTC) on Spinal Cord Injury (SCI): Promoting Health and Preventing Complications through Exercise is also funded by the NIDRR. The $4 million, 5-year grant allows MedStar NRH to further extend its research and training efforts on secondary conditions in people with SCI. The RRTC is a unique collaborative effort of national leaders in SCI-related research, clinical expertise, support and education organizations, independent living centers, and consumers with SCI.

Recovery Program

The MedStar NRH Stroke Recovery Program is among the largest programs in the country. MedStar NRH patients benefit the area's only CARF Accredited Specialty Program for Strokes.

The MedStar NRH Brain Injury Program uses repetition to expand on small incremental gains in recovery—to achieve their outcome.

The orthopedic programs at MedStar NRH utilize technological diagnostic and therapeutic equipment to address such issues as arthritis, amputation, joint replacement, and a full range of other orthopedic injuries and conditions.

Throughout patients’ rehabilitative experience, MedStar NRH relies upon a number of assistive technology devices that have been developed by MedStar NRH's research team, and which have been used fortheir recovery.

National Center for Children's Rehabilitation (NCCR)

The National Center for Children's Rehabilitation (NCCR) at MedStar NRH addresses an unmet regional need and raises the bar for care of pediatric patients with neurological, orthopedic injuries, and other illnesses. The only center of its kind in the area, the NCCR is a joint service of MedStar NRH and Children's National Medical Center and offers an innovative approach to children's rehab in a state-of-the-art and secure unit.

Research and technology
Advanced rehabilitation technology such as the Zero/G gait training tool and Alter/G anti-gravity treadmill has earned MedStar NRH the reputation as one of the leading participants in research for rehabilitation technology.

Christoph Ruesch Research Center

The Christoph Ruesch Research Center at MedStar NRH is dedicated to implementing initiatives that probe new rehabilitative interventions to address the health and rehabilitative needs of person with disabilities, and to develop better ways to deliver and pay for these services.

There are four unique centers conducting both laboratory and clinical research: the Assistive Technology Research Center, the Center for Post-Acute Studies, the Neuroscience Research Center, and the Center for Applied Biomechanics and Rehabilitation Research.

Dozens of studies are underway in the development of improved rehabilitative diagnosis and treatment methods, and technology aimed at improving long-term independence for persons with a variety of disabling conditions. Among these are a unique study to evaluate the value of activity-based rehab and FES, functional electrical stimulation, for spinal cord injury patients, a project to test the value of patient navigation to improve long-term outcomes for stroke and spinal cord patients, and a program to reduce secondary incidents among the capital region's stroke patients.

Four Laboratory and Research Centers

Assistive Technology & Research Center

Uncover new technology that increases the effectiveness of recovery. Also increases a patient's ability to live independently with a disability.

Center for Post-Acute Innovation & Research

Aims to offer guidance on the quality and financing of post-acute rehab.

Neuroscience Research Center

Congress approves 6 million dollars for new neuroscience research center in 2000.  This area deals with research related to clinical psychology, speech language therapy, health services, and rehabilitation engineering.

Center for Applied Biomechanics and Rehabilitation Research
Research involving impairments, limitations, and recovery.  The center focuses primarily on neurological and musculoskeletal factors.

References

External links
 http://www.medstarhealth.org/default.cfm
 http://www.medstarnrh.org
 https://web.archive.org/web/20080615195033/http://www.ncscims.org/home/
 http://www.jointcommission.org/
 https://web.archive.org/web/20090624230531/http://www.ed.gov/about/offices/list/osers/nidrr/index.html
 http://www.sci-health.org

Hospitals in Washington, D.C.
Rehabilitation medicine organizations based in the United States
Hospital buildings completed in 1986
Hospitals established in 1986
1986 establishments in Washington, D.C.
Rehabilitation hospitals